Experience Estabrook (April 30, 1813  March 26, 1894) was an American attorney and legal administrator.  He was the 3rd Attorney General of Wisconsin and the 1st United States Attorney for the Nebraska Territory.

Biography

Born in Lebanon, New Hampshire, he moved with his parents to Clarence, New York, in 1822 where he attended the public schools. Estabrook then attended Dickinson College in Carlisle, Pennsylvania. He graduated from Chambersburg, Pennsylvania Law School, and then was admitted to the bar in Brooklyn, New York in 1839. He worked as a clerk at the Navy Yard in Brooklyn and later  practiced law in Buffalo, New York. In 1840, he moved to Geneva, Wisconsin in 1840 and continued the practice of law. Estabrook was a delegate to the second Wisconsin State Constitutional Convention in 1848; in 1851, he became a member of the Wisconsin State Assembly. He was Attorney General of Wisconsin in 1852 and 1853.

Estabrook was appointed as United States Attorney, by President Franklin Pierce, for the Nebraska Territory and served from 1855 to 1859.

He ran for Delegate to the Thirty-sixth United States Congress and won by 300 votes, but his opponent Samuel G. Daily contested the election and won. The House Committee on Elections found many cases of fraud and voter irregularities ranging from  improperly commissioned election officials to the vote total from Izard county exceeding the county's population. Estabrook served from March 4, 1859, to May 18, 1860, when he was removed and replaced by Samuel G. Daily. Experience Estabrook was appointed by the Governor to codify the Nebraska State laws in 1866.

He then became the prosecuting attorney for Douglas County, Nebraska in 1867 and 1868. He was a  member of the Nebraska State Constitutional Convention in 1871.

Experience Estabrook died in Omaha, Nebraska, and was buried in Forest Lawn Cemetery in Omaha.

His daughter, Caroline, was a composer. His son, Henry Dodge Estabrook, was a lawyer in New York City.

References

External links

|-

|-

|-

1813 births
1894 deaths
19th-century American lawyers
19th-century American politicians
Delegates to the United States House of Representatives from Nebraska Territory
Dickinson College alumni
Lawyers from Omaha, Nebraska
Members of the United States House of Representatives removed by contest
Members of the Wisconsin State Assembly
Nebraska Democrats
New York (state) lawyers
People from Clarence, New York
People from Geneva, Wisconsin
People from Lebanon, New Hampshire
Politicians from Omaha, Nebraska
Wisconsin Attorneys General
Wisconsin lawyers